Kilkee is a small coastal town in County Clare, Ireland. It is in the parish of Kilkee, formerly Kilfearagh. Kilkee is midway between Kilrush and Doonbeg on the N67 road. The town is popular as a seaside resort. The horseshoe bay is protected from the Atlantic Ocean by the Duggerna Reef.

History

During the early part of the 19th century, Kilkee was just a small fishing village but in the 1820s when a paddle steamer service from Limerick to Kilrush was launched, it began to attract visitors. It has been a resort since then and was featured on the front page of The Illustrated London News as the premier bathing spot in what was then the United Kingdom of Great Britain and Ireland. Gradually the town grew as the demand for holiday homes by the sea increased, resulting in a building boom in the 1830s. As demand for lodgings in Kilkee grew, several hotels were built. Along with these, three churches were built, a Roman Catholic church in 1831, a Protestant church in 1843 and a Methodist church in 1900, reflecting the cosmopolitan nature of the town in that era.

Descriptions of Kilkee during the Irish Famine can be found in John Manners's travel narrative Notes of an Irish Tour, in 1846 and Sidney Godolphin Osborne's Gleanings in the West of Ireland published in 1850. Manners emphasises Kilkee's popularity as a seaside resort and comments on its overcrowded beach and dangerous waves:"Kilkee itself is the quaintest collection of little whitewashed cottages, some distinguished by the name of 'lodges,' that ever aspired to the dignity of a bathing-place. . . .The lodges are built round a little sandy creek, and here . . . plies the one bathing-machine which the decent liberality of Lady Chatterton presented to this Clare Herne Bay; and if you don't choose to wade a quarter of a mile among a hundred fellow-bathers over the said sands, you must do as I did, look out for some cranny among the black rocks, and trust to the mercifulness of the Atlantic waves, or to your own strength and skill, to avoid being knocked up against those scarifiers of sides and shins: may you fare better than I did this morning!" (Manners, 1849, pp. 55–61).

Osborne extols Kilkee's scenic beauty: "Kilkee, [is] a small sea-bathing place about eight miles . . .  [from Kilrush]. No traveller through this part of Ireland, should omit a visit to this little town; there is a very comfortable hotel, and within a walk of it, some scenery, which in its own way, can hardly be surpassed. I do not know that I ever saw a sea-view, that struck me more for its wild beauty, than that which is to be seen from the cliffs, which command the entrance to the bay, on which Kilkee is situated. The rocks are of a very dark stone; in places, quite perpendicular, and of great depth; the waves of the Atlantic rolling in huge breakers upon them, throwing up vast clouds of white spray against and over them, had a most magnificent effect" (Osborne, 1850, p. 20).

On 30 January 1836 the Intrinsic, a ship from Liverpool bound for New Orleans, was blown into a bay near Bishops Island in Kilkee. The ship was dashed repeatedly against the cliffs and sank along with her crew of 14, of whom none survived. The shipwreck site is now called 'Intrinsic Bay'. A chartered passenger sailing vessel named the Edmond sank at Edmond Point on 19 November 1850. The ship was sailing from Limerick to New York City but was driven into Kilkee Bay by a storm. As the tide was very high, the ship was driven all the way to Edmond Point, where it split in two. Of the 216 on board, 98 drowned in the disaster. Exactly 50 years to the day after the Intrinsic sank, on 30 January 1886, the Fulmar sank just north of Kilkee in an area known as Farrihy Bay. The ship was a cargo vessel transporting coal from Troon in Scotland to Limerick, but never reached its destination. Of the 17 crew members aboard only one body was ever recovered.

At some point during 28 and 29 December 1894, the Inishtrahull went missing somewhere near the Kilkee coast. At the time of the disappearance the ship was transporting a consignment of coal from Glasgow to Limerick but never reached its intended destination. The ship was only confirmed to have sunk on 3 January 1985, when a section of a port bow from a ship with a brass plate marked "Glasgow" was picked up by the Kilkee coastguards.

In the 1890s, Kilkee had yet again another boom, when the West Clare Railway opened up to goods transport, improving commercial life in the area, as well as providing a relatively fast means of travel to and from the town. Many prominent people in society travelled to Kilkee including Sir Aubrey de Vere, Charlotte Brontë (who spent her honeymoon here), Sir Henry Rider Haggard, and Alfred, Lord Tennyson. In 1896, the Crown Princess of Austria visited the town. The entertainer Percy French was a regular performer in the town and an incident on the West Clare Railway on the way to Kilkee prompted him to write the song "Are Ye Right There Michael". Although it has become more developed and modern in recent years, the town retains some of its 19th-century Victorian feel.

Kilkee has regularly been awarded the Blue Flag by the European Commission. In 2006, a statue of Richard Harris was unveiled in Kilkee by actor Russell Crowe.

Tourism
Kilkee is the longest established seaside resort in Ireland and is still one of the most popular with  a loyal following going back many generations. In addition to the excellent beach, regarded as one of the safest beaches in Ireland, especially for children, there many other things to do in Kilkee.  Many people from all over the world come to Kilkee to dive and see the abundant fish life and wondrous rock formations. There is a very active Scuba Diving Club. Water sports like canoeing, paddle boarding are popular and there are lessons given during the summer. The public walks are famous and the actor Russell Crowe stated the famous cliff walk was the finest public walk in the world. Whale and dolphin are also popular and there is an abundance of both in the surrounding Atlantic waters. Over the more recent years, during a period of rapid economic growth in Ireland known as the 'Celtic Tiger', Kilkee underwent considerable expansion with the development of hotels, estates and other forms of housing. The town's main source of income is still the tourism sector and therefore many recreational places have been established, including restaurants, pubs and cafés. It was one of the premier spots for eating out in Clare with a wide array of Restaurants many of which are open all year round. Summer holidays in 1950s Kilkee are evocatively described in Homan Potterton's memoir, Rathcormick (2001).

Sport and recreation
Along with bathing on the strand, swimmers can choose from the Pollock Holes, New Found Out and Byrnes Cove. The Pollock Holes, which is also known as Duggerna Reef, are three natural rock-enclosed pools, with water that is changed by every tide. This not only brings in fresh water, but replenishes the marine life in the many rock pools surrounding it. The diving boards at New Found Out allow for dives of up to 13 metres (45 feet) into the open sea. The annual diving competition is held at these boards.

Every year there are many participants in the Bay Swim, a race of roughly a mile from the east end of the town to the west across the bay. The race starts at Byrnes Cove, a sheltered cove situated close to George's Head, a prominent headland in the town. In 2011 nearly 200 people took part in the swim. There is also a mini bay swim for children under fourteen, from Sandy Cove to the Pier.
The last weekend in June sees an influx of triathletes as Kilkee hosts the "Hell of the West Triathlon", the longest-running triathlon in the country. This is one of the biggest and toughest triathlons on the Irish Triathlon calendar with upwards of 600 athletes taking part in a 1500-metre swim, 45 km cycle and finishing with a 10 km road race.

Kilkee has a reputation as a place to enjoy diving. Jacques Cousteau declared that it was the best place in Europe for diving, and one of the top five in the world. The Kilkee Dive Centre is a fully equipped SCUBA diving centre which caters to both beginners and experts. Divers can go to depths from 10 metres (32 feet) to 45 metres (147 feet). The diverse marine life in the reefs around the bay attract divers from around the world.

A version of racquetball (not squash, as is often incorrectly stated) has been played against the high sandstone walls in the West End for generations, and it is possible that the rules were codified in Kilkee before racquetball was standardised anywhere else. The main trophy, the Tivoli cup, was first competed for in Kilkee in 1935; racquetball in its current form was not codified internationally until 1950. Richard Harris, who would go on to become an internationally known actor, won the cup four years in a row, from 1948 to 1951, a record surpassed by no one to this day.

The Strand Races are horse races contested annually on the Kilkee strand. They first began in the 19th century on the sand-hills where the golf club is now. The races are normally held over two days in September, when the summer season is drawing to a close. The course is made by placing poles on the beach and when the tide goes out the races begin. Traditionally it was a celebration for farmers when the harvesting season is over.

Kilkee has a strong GAA tradition, where the local team is known as St. Senan's. The club has won many county finals at all levels and has reached two Munster Senior Football Final deciders. The people of the town are proud of their strong history with Gaelic sports, particularly in football as the club has won many titles over the years.

Kilkee is popular with walkers as different routes stretch out in every direction from the bay. The most popular walk is the cliff walk, which involves walking up the Dunlicky Road and then turning right onto the cliffs by Intrinsic Bay, following the path until you eventually end up at the Pollack Holes.

The East End of the town is home to an 18-hole golf course. The first and second tees overlook the Atlantic Ocean and the third tee overlooks Chimney Bay.

A short lived greyhound racing track was opened by the Kilkee Greyhound Racing Company on 2 July 1936. The land and assets of the track (behind the Olympia Hall and Merton Square) were put up for sale in 1942.

Transport

Before the West Clare Railway opened in 1887, the only way to get to the town was by paddle steamer from Limerick to Kilrush and then by horse and cart from there. This service ran from 1816 until 1918 but was stopped after World War I due to the popularity of the railway, although for many years the railway and steamer services ran together with a special "Steamer Express" train to and from Kilkee. After the railway closed in 1961, the only way to get to the resort was by car but as the mainline rail system now connects Limerick and Galway to Ennis, it is still possible to get the train as far as Ennis. Although the only bus routes offered by Bus Éireann from Kilkee are to Kilrush, Ennis and Limerick (via Shannon Airport), it is possible to get to Cork or even Dublin through connecting buses or trains.
For international visitors the closest airport is in Shannon. Shannon airport offers services to Europe, the US and Canada.

See also
 List of towns and villages in Ireland
 List of tourist attractions in Ireland

References

External links

 Kilkee official website
 

 
Seaside resorts in the Republic of Ireland
Towns and villages in County Clare
Tourist attractions in County Clare
Surfing locations in Ireland
Beaches of County Clare